Raiza Patricia Erlenbaugh Soriano, (born 6 March 1991, Panama City, Panama) is a Panamanian model and beauty pageant contestant winner of the Miss Panama World 2014 title on 8 April 2014 for Miss World 2014 contest. On November 12, 2014 she was dethroned as Miss World Panamá 2013 by the Miss Panamá Organization.

Miss Panamá World 2014 

At the end of the Miss Panamá 2014 she also received awards including Miss Photogenic.

Erlenbaugh is 5 ft 10 in (1.77 m) tall, and competed in the national beauty pageant Miss Panamá 2014. She represented the state of Panamá Centro.

Miss World 2014 

Raiza was supposed to fly to the London in November to compete with almost 100 other candidates to be Megan Young successor, but on November 12, 2014 Miss Panamá Organization decided not to let her compete  for not fulfilled her duties. She was replaced by Nicole Pinto who was the 1st Runner-up at Miss Mundo Panamá 2014 pageant and was later crowned,  Miss Latin America 2014 which she later quit to go to the Miss World 2014.

See also
 Miss Panamá 2014

References

External links
Panamá 2014 official website
Miss Panamá

1991 births
Living people
Panamanian beauty pageant winners
Panamanian female models
Señorita Panamá